Kalia Davis (born October 2, 1998) is an American football defensive tackle for the San Francisco 49ers in the National Football League (NFL). He played college football for the UCF Knights.

Professional career

Davis was selected by the San Francisco 49ers in the sixth round, 220th overall, of the 2022 NFL Draft. In June 2022, Davis was signed to his rookie deal, a four-year contract with a total value of over $3.8 million. He was placed on the reserve/non-football injury list on August 23, 2022.

References

External links
 San Francisco 49ers bio
 UCF Knights bio

Living people
American football defensive tackles
Players of American football from Pensacola, Florida
San Francisco 49ers players
UCF Knights football players
1998 births